Birk Risa (born 13 February 1998) is a Norwegian professional footballer who plays as a defender for Molde.

Club career

1. FC Köln
Risa joined 1. FC Köln's youth ranks in 2014 from Sandnes Ulf. He made his Bundesliga debut for 1. FC Köln on 10 December 2017 against SC Freiburg.

Odd
In March 2018, he left 1. FC Köln to return to Norway, joining Odd on a contract until December 2021. Despite his debut in Bundesliga in 2017, Risa signed for Odds BK to play regularly in the first team.

Molde
On 6 October 2020, Risa signed a contract with Molde until 2023. He made his debut on 25 October in a 2–1 win over Strømsgodset. His European debut followed on 26 November, as he started at left-back in the 3–0 home loss to Arsenal in the UEFA Europa League group stage. Molde would manage to knock out Hoffenheim in the round of 32, but eventually lost on aggregate to Granada in the round of 16. Risa made five appearances for Molde in the 2020–21 European campaign. 

Risa scored his first goal for Molde on 16 June 2021 in a 4–1 win over Sarpsborg 08, after having come on as a substitute for Kristoffer Haugen in the 80th minute and scoring in injury time.

Career statistics

Club

Honours
Molde
Eliteserien: 2022
 Norwegian Cup: 2021–22

References

External links
 
 
 

1998 births
Living people
Sportspeople from Stavanger
Norwegian footballers
Norway youth international footballers
Norway under-21 international footballers
Association football defenders
1. FC Köln players
1. FC Köln II players
Odds BK players
Molde FK players
Bundesliga players
Regionalliga players
Eliteserien players
Norwegian expatriate footballers
Norwegian expatriate sportspeople in Germany
Expatriate footballers in Germany